Achtung! Banditi! also known as Attention! Bandits! is a 1951 Italian World War II film drama directed by Carlo Lizzani and starring Gina Lollobrigida and Andrea Checchi.

Plot

Cast
Gina Lollobrigida as Anna
Andrea Checchi as the engineer
Lamberto Maggiorani as Marco
Giuseppe Taffarel as Commander Vento
Vittorio Duse as Domenico
Giuliano Montaldo as Lorenzo
Franco Bologna as Gatto
Maria Laura Rocca as the diplomat's lover
Pietro Tordi as the diplomat
Ferdinando Costa as a German official
Bruno Berellini as a blond man
Pietro Ferro as a partisan
Lucia Feltrin as the courier
Giuseppe Mantero as Pietro
Domenico Grassi as a German soldier

Notes and references

External links 
 

1950s Italian-language films
Italian black-and-white films
Italian Campaign of World War II films
1951 films
Films directed by Carlo Lizzani
Films set in Genoa
Films with screenplays by Ugo Pirro
Films about Italian resistance movement
Italian war drama films
1950s war drama films
Italian World War II films
1950s Italian films